The men's 4 × 440 yards relay at the 1962 British Empire and Commonwealth Games as part of the athletics programme was held at the Perry Lakes Stadium on Saturday 1 December 1962.

Eights nations competed in two heats in the first round, with the top three from each heat qualifying for the final.

The event was won Jamaican team of Malcolm Spence, Laurie Khan, Mel Spence and George Kerr in a time of 3:10.2. They finished a full second ahead of English team of Adrian Metcalfe, Robert Setti, Barry Jackson and Robbie Brightwell and the Ghanaian quartet of Ebenezer Quartey, James Addy, Frederick Owusu and John Asare-Antwi who won bronze.

Records

Round 1

Heat 1

Heat 2

Final

References

Men's 4 x 440 yards relay
1962